Oscar Bernard Brockmeyer (November 13, 1883 – January 10, 1954) was an American amateur soccer player who competed in the 1904 Summer Olympics. He was the son of Dora (Luebbering) and Bernard Henry Brockmeyer, His Grandparents moved from Glane, Germany to St. Louis, Missouri. He had 4 brothers and 3 sisters. He is also the grandson of Johann Friedrich Lübbering.

In 1904 he was a member of the Christian Brothers College team, which won the silver medal in the soccer tournament. He played all four matches as a defender. Oscar graduated in 1904 at C.B.C and went to the University of Missouri in Columbia, Missouri, he had a scholarship there, and played soccer for the Varsity in 1905.

When he came home, he went to work at the City Hall of St. Louis as a draftsman.

Personal life
He married Florence Louise Hoevel (1883–1952) and they had the following children:
 Oscar Bernard Brockmeyer, jr. (1919–1984),
 Charles E. Brockmeyer (1922–1978).

References

External links
profile I
profile II

1883 births
1954 deaths
American soccer players
American people of German descent
Footballers at the 1904 Summer Olympics
Olympic silver medalists for the United States in soccer
Soccer players from St. Louis
Medalists at the 1904 Summer Olympics
University of Missouri alumni
Association football defenders
Christian Brothers Cadets men's soccer players
Missouri Tigers men's soccer players